Lipnice nad Sázavou is a town in Havlíčkův Brod District in the Vysočina Region of the Czech Republic. It has about 600 inhabitants.

Administrative parts

The village of Vilémovec is an administrative part of Lipnice nad Sázavou.

Geography
It lies in the Křemešník Highlands.

Despite the town's name, the Sázava River does not flow through the municipal territory and there are no significant watercourses. The pond Kamenná trouba and the eponymous nature reserve are located west of the town.

History
The first written mention of Lipnice is from 1226. It was the so-called Lower Lipnice and refers to today's Dolní Město. The Lipnice Castle was founded in 1310 and the settlement of Upper Lipnice was founded together with the castle. In 1370, it was acquired by King Charles IV and promoted to a town. It was a town until the reforms in the middle of the 19th century.

It is very likely that the so-called Lipnice Bible from 1421 was finished here.

In September 2019, the town status was granted back to Lipnice.

Sights
The most notable landmark and the main tourist destination of the town is the Lipnice Castle.

In the house, where Jaroslav Hašek lived and worked in 1921–1923, is now the Memorial of Jaroslav Hašek with an exposition on his life and work.

Notable people
Jindřich Matyáš Thurn (1567–1640), nobleman and military leader
Jaroslav Hašek (1883–1923), writer; lived and died here
Karel Čáslavský (1937–2013), film historian

References

External links

Lipnice Castle

Cities and towns in the Czech Republic
Populated places in Havlíčkův Brod District